Patricia Burke Ziegfeld Stephenson (October 23, 1916 – April 11, 2008) was an American author.

Early life and education

Patricia Ziegfeld was born in New York City in 1916 to Florenz Ziegfeld, a Broadway impresario, and Billie Burke, an actress best known for playing Glinda the Good Witch in The Wizard of Oz. She grew up in Hastings-on-Hudson in Westchester County, New York. She also lived at the family's home in Palm Beach, Florida.

Her father died in 1932 and she moved to California with her mother. She attended UCLA then did some acting and writing for newspapers.

Adulthood
She married William Robert Stephenson, Sr. (1912–2007) on June 11, 1939. She met Stephenson while he was working as a dance instructor at the Beverly Hills Hotel. He designed homes  including the General Electric  show home for Ronald Reagan and Nancy Reagan. They had four children: Cecilia Duncan Stephenson, Florenz Crossley Stephenson, Susan Plemons Stephenson, and William Robert Stephenson, Jr.

In 1963, she published an autobiography, The Ziegfelds' Girl: Confessions of an Abnormally Happy Childhood. She also wrote the introduction for a biography of her father, The Ziegfeld Touch: The Life and Times of Florenz Ziegfeld, Jr., which was written by her cousins, Richard and Paulette Ziegfeld.

She died of congestive heart failure at her home in Los Angeles at the age of 91. She had nine grandchildren and three great-grandchildren, at the time of her death.

References

External links

1916 births
2008 deaths
Writers from New York City
People from Palm Beach, Florida
American autobiographers
20th-century American biographers
American women biographers
Women autobiographers
20th-century American women writers
21st-century American women